Robert Conway is an American independent filmmaker. He is best known for his work on the horror thriller films The Encounter, Krampus Unleashed, Krampus: The Reckoning, Krampus Origins, and The Covenant.

Life and career
Robert was born in Philadelphia, Pennsylvania. His directorial debut feature film Redemption, in 2009. He is also slated to direct the upcoming feature films Eminence Hill and Rhea.

Filmography

References

External links 

Living people
American film directors
Horror film directors
1979 births